Gangavathi Pranesh, also known as Gangavathi Beechi and Junior Beechi is an Indian stand-up comedian who primarily performs in Kannada, often sharing his life experiences through his humorous speeches . He is very popular among Kannadigas and has traveled over 11 countries such as USA, Australia, Dubai, Singapore, and England for entertaining Indians over there . He has also given around 3500 programs in 400 places in State of Karnataka.

He appeared as popular face in Kannada talk show Harate (ಹರಟೆ) which is aired on Udaya TV and also in various Kannada TV reality shows as  Guest Speaker. Has Won around 30 awards and been honoured by Hundreds of Organizations

Humour festivals
Gangavathi Pranesh along with other artists like Basvaraj Mahamani, Narshimha Joshi started giving stand-up comedy performances, which came to be known as Hasya Utsava, Hasya Sanje  or Humour Festival in Karnataka. His speeches are mainly based on humour and contains social awareness. Pranesh has been praised by audiences and critics alike for his unique style and content, inspired by Beechi.

Appeared in several Kannada TV programs as a Guest Speaker. Pranesh appeared in Talk show Weekend With Ramesh season 3. He has been judge in TV reality shows like Comedy Kiladigalu and Kannadada Kanmani.

Pranesh made his acting debut in Kannada film Mussanjemaatu in 2008 Starting Sudeep and Ramya.

Pranesh has also been admired for his art of literature. He has written over 5 books:  Nagisuvavana Novugalu, Vaghbanagalu, Pranesh Payana, Pranesh Punch and Nakkava Geddava.  And he writes for a Column in Kannada news paper Vishwavani  every Wednesday.

References

External links
 Official website

Indian stand-up comedians
Living people
1968 births